Viljar is both an Estonian and an Old Norse masculine given name.
Its Estonian meaning is "grow" or "nourishment", whereas the Old Norse version of the name means "Willing warrior".

People named Viljar include:
Viljar Loor (1953–2011), volleyball player
Viljar Myhra (born 1996), football player
Viljar Peep (born 1969), historian and civil servant
Viljar Schiff (born 1974), military personnel
Viljar Veski (born 1986), basketball player
Viljar Vevatne (born 1994), football player

References

Estonian masculine given names
Norwegian masculine given names